Alexandr Belkin (born 7 January 1983) is a Russian snowboarder. He competed in the men's parallel giant slalom event at the 2006 Winter Olympics.

References

External links
 

1983 births
Living people
Russian male snowboarders
Olympic snowboarders of Russia
Snowboarders at the 2006 Winter Olympics
People from Tashtagol
Sportspeople from Kemerovo Oblast